West Vale railway station served on the Stainland Branch from 1875 to 1929.

History
The station was opened on New years day 1875, along with the rest of the branch. For such a small branch, the station was well developed. The main station buildings were located on the up platform, and contained the booking office, with ticket windows for first, second, and third class, opening into a large general waiting room. In addition, there were also separate ladies and gentleman's waiting rooms on either side of the booking office, plus other general facilities. On the down platform was a grand building, with a general waiting room and first class rooms for ladies and gentlemen either side

The buildings and platform have been demolished and the land developed, but were located a little south west of where Green Lane meets Green Royd. A footpath still follows the track bed south from Green Royd. Sustrans and Calderdale Council are in the process of reopening the trackbed north over the grade II listed viaduct as part of the national cycle network.

Route

References

Disused railway stations in Calderdale
Former Lancashire and Yorkshire Railway stations
Railway stations in Great Britain opened in 1875
Railway stations in Great Britain closed in 1929